Parliamentary elections were held in the Kingdom of Dalmatia in 1908. They were the last held for the Dalmatian parliament in Zadar, as World War I broke out before the end of the government's mandate in 1915. The parliament was eventually abandoned and no new government was elected before Dalmatia became a part of the State of Slovenes, Croats and Serbs, and later the Kingdom of Serbs, Croats and Slovenes.

Results

Elections in Croatia
Dalmatia
1908 in Croatia
Elections in Austria-Hungary
History of Dalmatia
Election and referendum articles with incomplete results